"Just Wanna Rock" is a song by American rapper Lil Uzi Vert from their upcoming mixtape The Pink Tape. It was released as a single through Atlantic Records and Generation Now on October 17, 2022. Uzi wrote the song with producers MCVertt and Synthetic. They previously teased it on the video-sharing app TikTok, in which the song gained over 500 million views.

Composition and lyrics
"Just Wanna Rock" is an uptempo dance and Jersey club song. It sees "Uzi chanting frantically over a synthy, queasy high-BPM beat". The song includes a heavy drill beat with one short verse and a chorus that is barely above a whisper.

Music video
The official music video was filmed on November 2022, released on November 18, 2022, directed By Gibson Harazard who worked with Woods in the past. The music video was filmed in New York City and features AMP members Kai Cenat and Fanum, upcoming Philly rapper 2Rare and Drew Jeeezy, who popularized the dance and it went viral on TikTok.

Credits and personnel
 Lil Uzi Vert – vocals, songwriting
 MCVertt – production, songwriting
 Synthetic – production, songwriting
 Benjamin Thomas – mixing, recording
 Don Cannon – mixing
 Colin Leonard – mastering
 Feez – engineering assistance
 Frank Holland – engineering assistance

Charts

Certifications

References

2022 songs
2022 singles
Atlantic Records singles
Lil Uzi Vert songs
Songs written by Lil Uzi Vert
American dance songs